USCGC Washington (WPB-1331) is an  cutter of the United States Coast Guard. Washington was constructed at Bollinger Machine Shop and Shipyard in Lockport, Louisiana, and commissioned on 15 June 1990.

Currently operating in the Coast Guard 14th District, the cutter reports to Sector Guam. Washington supports multi-mission operations throughout Sector Guam's vast area of responsibility, which includes the U.S. Exclusive Economic Zones surrounding Guam and the Commonwealth of the Northern Mariana Islands and an international SAR area that includes the Republic of Palau and the Federated States of Micronesia, conducting search and rescue response missions, and ports, waterways and coastal security operations.

Washington was decommissioned at Naval Base Guam on 18 December 2019.

Design
The s were constructed in Bollinger Shipyards, Lockport, Louisiana. It is powered two Paxman Valenta 16 CM diesel engines or two Caterpillar 3516 diesel engines. It has two  3304T diesel generators made by Caterpillar; these can serve as motor–generators. Its hull is constructed from highly strong steel, and the superstructure and major deck are constructed from aluminum.

It is fitted with one  machine gun and two  M60 light machine guns; it may also be fitted with two Browning .50 caliber machine guns. It is fitted with satellite navigation systems, collision avoidance systems, surface radar, and a Loran C system. Its complement is sixteen (two officers and fourteen crew members). Island-class patrol boats are based on Vosper Thornycroft  patrol boats and have similar dimensions.

Operational career

In October 2019 the Washington participated in a joint fisheries patrol, off Palau, in cooperation with the Pacific Islands Forum Fisheries Agency.

Notes

References
USCGC Assateague page

Island-class patrol boats
1989 ships
Ships built in Lockport, Louisiana